Alkmene (minor planet designation: 82 Alkmene) is a main-belt asteroid. Alkmene was discovered by R. Luther on 7 November 1864 and named after Alcmene, the mother of Herakles in Greek mythology. A satellite has been suggested based on 1985 lightcurve data.

Asteroid Alkmene occulted the apparent magnitude 7.5 star HIP 99229 in the constellation of Capricornus on 18 September 2014 around 06:41 UT (17 September 23:41 PDT) and was centered on Sacramento, CA. Asteroid occultations allow for accurate 2-dimensional mapping of an asteroids silhouette when observed by multiple telescopes separated by about 10 km (6.2 mi).

References

External links
 
 

Background asteroids
Alkmene
Alkmene
S-type asteroids (Tholen)
Sq-type asteroids (SMASS)
18641127